Theodore Roosevelt Augustus Major Poston (July 4, 1906 – January 11, 1974) was an American journalist and author. He was one of the first African-American journalists to work on a mainstream white-owned newspaper, the New York Post. Poston is often referred to as the "Dean of Black Journalists".

Early life

Poston was born in Hopkinsville, Kentucky. His mother, Mollie Cox, died when he was ten and he was raised mostly by his eight older siblings, while his father, Ephraim Poston, taught the Kentucky State Industrial College for Negroes (now Kentucky State University) in Frankfurt, more than two hundred miles away.

By the age of fifteen, Poston began his career writing articles for his family's paper, the Hopkinsville Contender.

In 1928, he graduated from Tennessee Agricultural and Industrial College (now Tennessee State University) and moved to New York City to pursue a career in journalism.

Career
Poston became a reporter for the New York Amsterdam News, a weekly newspaper geared to the city's African-American community, in Harlem in 1928. By 1935, he became editor of the paper but was later fired after attempting to unionize his fellow reporters.

The following year, he was temporarily hired by the New York Post in 1936, which made him the third black to be hired as a reporter for a major New York City daily paper.

When he was assigned to the New York City Police Department pressroom, none of the other reporters would talk to him. Within the ranks of the Post, he was considered a star reporter and was a favorite of the owner, Dorothy Schiff. Over the years, Poston used his influence with Schiff to lobby for the hiring of more black and Puerto Rican reporters.

During his thirty-five year career at the Post, Poston covered many important stories of the day, such as Jackie Robinson's entrance into Major League Baseball, the Brown v. Board of Education case and the efforts of the Little Rock Nine to integrate schools in Little Rock, Arkansas. While covering the story of the Little Rock Nine in 1959, Poston was shot at by a group of white men. He also covered the Scottsboro Boys trials with much difficulty, as the Alabama authorities would not allow a black journalist to report in the segregated South. He had to resort to disguising himself as a preacher and turning in his stories secretly with the help of white colleagues. In 1949, he was pursued by white mobs when he attempted to cover the Groveland Four in Lake County, Florida. He safely escaped and wrote a series on the Groveland Case, for which the Post nominated him for a Pulitzer Prize.

During World War II, Poston temporarily left New York to work for the Office of War Information in Washington, DC. There he served as "Negro liaison" for the Office and was a part of Franklin D. Roosevelt's Black Cabinet. After Roosevelt's death, Poston joined other black journalists in pressuring Harry S. Truman to desegregate the military.

Later years

Poston retired from the Post in 1972 to work on a collection of autobiographical short stories. He was unable to complete the work as he suffered from complications from arteriosclerosis. He died on January 11, 1974, at his home in Bedford–Stuyvesant, Brooklyn.

Legacy
Poston was one of the first journalists inducted into the National Association of Black Journalists Hall of Fame when it opened in 1990. In 1999, his series on the Groveland Case was named one the 100 most important journalistic works of the 20th century by New York University's School of Journalism. His book of short stories was published posthumously in 1991 as The Dark Side of Hopkinsville.

Personal life
Poston was married three times. His first wife was Miriam Rivers (m. 1935–1940). In 1941, while working in Washington he married Marie Byrd Tancil, a staffer for Robert C. Weaver. The couple divorced in 1956. Poston married Ersa Hines Clinton in 1957. She worked for New York Governor Nelson Rockefeller. They remained married until Poston's death in 1974, although they were separated at the time. Poston was friends with Langston Hughes and traveled to the Soviet Union with him in 1932 to appear in an anti-segregation film. He also lived next door to his friend Thurgood Marshall for many years.

Awards and honors
1949 George Polk Award for National Reporting
1949 Heywood Broun Award
1972 Black Perspective award for Pioneering Journalists
1990 National Association of Black Journalists Hall of Fame inductee

References

External links

1906 births
1974 deaths
Deaths from arteriosclerosis
Journalists from Kentucky
American male journalists
African-American writers
African-American journalists
People from Hopkinsville, Kentucky
People of the United States Office of War Information
20th-century American journalists
20th-century African-American people